Gobardanga railway station is one of the oldest railway stations in North 24 Parganas district, West Bengal. Its code is GBG. It serves Gobardanga town. Its next Station towards Bangaon is Thakurnagar and its next Station towards Sealdah is Machhalandapur.

Connectivity 
Bangaon-Sealdah Local, Thakurnagar-Sealdah Local, Gobardanga-Sealdah Local connects it to Sealdah. Bangaon-Barasat Local connects it to various other stations up to Barasat. Bangaon-Majerhat and Bangaon-Canning connects it to Majerhat and Canning respectively. The Bandhan Express, which connects India with its neighbouring country Bangladesh, runs through the Station but does not stop here. It has always been a major railway between Habra and Bangaon.

Station complex 
The station consists of three platforms. All platforms are well sheltered. It has good facility of sanitation but lacks water.

History
Gobardanga railway station is located on Sealdah–Hasnabad–Bangaon–Ranaghat line of Kolkata Suburban Railway. Link between Dum Dum to Khulna now in Bangladesh, via Bangaon was constructed by Bengal Central Railway Company in 1882–84. The Sealah–Dum Dum–Barasat–Ashok Nagar–Bangaon sector was electrified in 1963–64. It is a busy railway station. Its location close to many educational and cultural insititutions makes it a significant place to visit between Habra and Bangaon. It was rebuilt in 2009.

Station

Layout

See also

References

External links 

 Gobardanga Station Map

Sealdah railway division
Railway stations in North 24 Parganas district
Kolkata Suburban Railway stations